Marquetalia is a town and municipality in the Colombian Department of Caldas.

Climate
Marquetalia has a cool tropical rainforest climate (Af) due to altitude.

References

Municipalities of Caldas Department